Ignaz Seipel (19 July 1876 – 2 August 1932) was an Austrian prelate, Catholic theologian and politician of the Christian Social Party. He was its chairman from 1921 to 1930 and served as Austria's federal chancellor twice, from 1922 to 1924 and 1926 to 1929. Seipel's terms in office saw the reorganization of the state's finances and passage of the 1929 amendment to the federal constitution that strengthened the role of the Austrian President. As chancellor he opposed the Social Democratic Party of Austria and Austromarxism and supported paramilitary militias such as the Heimwehr (Home Guard), an organization similar to the German Freikorps.

Life

Academician and priest 
 The son of a Viennese carriage driver, Seipel graduated from an academic high school in Vienna in 1895, then studied Catholic theology at the University of Vienna. He was ordained a priest on 23 July 1899 and received his doctorate in theology in 1903. Seipel was a member or honorary member of numerous Catholic student fraternities.

In his 1907 work reflecting Catholic social teaching, Ethical Teachings on Economics of the Church Fathers, he was the first to use the phrase "economic ethics". In 1908 he joined the Catholic Theological Faculty of the University of Vienna. From 1909 to 1917 he was professor of moral theology at the University of Salzburg. There he published his study Nation and State (1916), which helped cement his later prominent role in the Christian Social Party. In the book he viewed the state – the self-governing political entity – as the primary justification of sovereignty, rather than the nation – a group that shares a common culture, as for example speakers of German. In 1917 he was appointed professor at the University of Vienna, succeeding the moral theologian Franz Martin Schindler.

Politician 
On 27 October 1918, during the final days of the Austro-Hungarian Empire, Emperor Karl I appointed Seipel Minister of Public Works and Social Welfare in the ministry of Heinrich Lammasch, the last "imperial and royal" government of the Empire. At the beginning of November 1918, Seipel handed over his official duties to the government of Karl Renner of the Social Democratic Party of Austria. It had been appointed on 30 October 1918 by the State Council of German-Austria, the executive body of the short-lived Republic of German-Austria. The Lammasch ministry remained formally in office at the request of the Emperor until his own withdrawal. While still an imperial minister, Seipel was involved in formulating the declaration of abdication that the Emperor signed on 11 November 1918. On the same day. the Emperor dismissed the Lammasch ministry.

On 16 February 1919 Seipel was elected on the Christian Social ticket to the Constituent National Assembly, the body that adopted the constitution for the First Austrian Republic, which replaced the Republic of German-Austria. Seipel's parliamentary group elected him to the club presidium, one of its leadership bodies.

Seipel prevented the party from splitting in 1918 over the question of the abolition of the monarchy that was advocated by the Social Democrats and the greater Germans, the name for those who wanted Austria to join the German Reich (the Weimar Republic). In March 1919 he spoke out against the two parties' annexation euphoria on the grounds that annexation of German Austria to the German Reich was generally rejected by the victorious Allies of World War I and would endanger the peace treaty. In 1920 he nevertheless broke the Christian Social Party away from the coalition with the Social Democrats and formed an alliance with the nationalist Greater German People's Party.

Although Seipel supported the Austrian Republic's new parliamentary democracy, he was clearly skeptical of it. During the preliminary deliberations on the Federal Constitution in 1920 and thereafter in 1922, Seipel advocated a partial weakening of parliament in favor of a federal president endowed with significantly more extensive powers.

At the same time, Seipel supported the development of militant right-wing groups in Vienna, as seen above all in the fact that beginning in March 1920 he was a board member of the secret Association for Order and Law. The group included monarchist and greater German representatives as well as military figures. It planned the forcible suppression of the Social Democrats and worked closely with the Bavarian right-wing radicals around Georg Escherich.

In September 1920, in a speech that was clearly tinged with anti-Semitism, Seipel called for a numerus clausus – an enrollment limit – for Jews at higher-level schools, colleges, and universities "according to population".

Seipel served as chairman of the Christian Social Party (CS) from 1921 to 1930. At his party's request, he was Chancellor of Austria in a Christian Social – Greater German coalition from 31 May 1922 to 20 November 1924. During his first term he personally coordinated the distribution of industry funds to right-wing militias. Seipel's primary concern was with their military efficiency; ideological proximity to the CS party was secondary. He focused on the right-wing Front Fighters Union of German Austria under the anti-Semite Hermann Hiltl, which he also helped re-arm with financial resources from the Hungarian Horthy regime.

Seipel reorganized state finances with the aid of a League of Nations loan which was obtained when Austria officially renounced annexation to Germany. After fierce criticism from his own party and an assassination attempt on 1 June 1924, he resigned on 8 November 1924 but remained chairman of the Christian Socialist Deputies' Association. The would-be assassin, Karl Jaworek (or Jawurek), blamed Seipel for his poverty and shot the Chancellor at close range on the platform of a Vienna train station. Jaworek was sentenced to five years of hard labor.

In the fall of 1924 the Bavarian Immigration Police considered deporting Adolf Hitler from Bavaria to Austria if he were released from prison early. Hitler had been serving time at Landsberg Prison in Bavaria since April 1924 following his failed Beer Hall Putsch in 1923. Seipel did not want the putschist and troublemaker back in Austria and sent Bavaria a statement saying that Hitler had become a German by serving in its army. Bavaria attested that Austria had recognized the Austrian citizenship of German soldiers in other cases, but Seipel adhered to his legal opinion.

Theodor Körner, a retired general and successful Social Democratic candidate for parliament in 1924, paid tribute to Seipel during the election campaign. The Innsbruck newspaper  quoted him saying that Seipel was "as a character of integrity in every respect, a diligent, selfless worker".

From 1926 to 1929, Seipel was again Chancellor, fighting in particular against the Social Democrats. He united the CS with the Greater German People's Party, the Landbund (Rural Federation), and the National Socialist "Riehl and Schulz Group" to form an anti-Marxist front (the "Citizens' Bloc"). After the National Assembly election of 1927 in which Seipel's bloc won the majority of seats, there was a more rapid growth in the fundamental attitude that opposed Austrian democracy. With the help of Austrian industrialists, Chancellor Seipel strengthened the role of the increasingly anti-democratic Heimwehr and remained its most influential advocate until his death. This made him the great enemy of the Social Democrats.

In the Austrian town of Schattendorf on 30 January 1927, members of a right-wing paramilitary group fired on Social Democratic demonstrators, including members of its paramilitary Republican Protection League (Republikanischer Schutzbund), killing two and wounding five. The acquittal of the men charged in the deaths led to the July Revolt of 1927 in Vienna during which police killed 89 protestors and wounded over 600.  Afterwards, Social Democrats called Seipel a "prelate without clemency", a "prelate without mercy" and a "blood prelate". In his statement before the lower house of parliament, the National Council, on 26 July 1927, Seipel said, "In these days of misfortune, do not ask anything of the parliament and the government that would seem merciful to the victims and the guilty but would be cruel to the wounded republic." Seipel's statement was followed by an intensely heated parliamentary debate. The opposition seized on the phrase "without mercy" and linked it to their criticism of the excessive police action, for which they blamed Police Commissioner and former Austrian chancellor Johann Schober.

In 1928, Seipel, in agreement with Karl Buresch, the governor of Lower Austria, championed the interests of the Heimwehr by approving its march in Wiener Neustadt, as well as one by the Republican Protection League, against the express wish of Wiener Neustadt Mayor Anton Ofenböck. As Chancellor, Seipel was able to show his strength with a massive contingent of police and military. There were no violent incidents on the days of the marches.

Seipel resigned from the office of chancellor on 4 April 1929, although he continued in office until 4 May, when he was succeeded as head of government by Ernst Streeruwitz, also of the Christian Social Party. In all, five federal governments of the First Republic were under Seipel's leadership.

Post-chancellorship and contemporary assessments 
Seipel was not satisfied with the First Republic's form of government. He was a major driver behind the push to strengthen the role of the federal president that was realized in the 1929 amendment to the federal constitution. Seipel negotiated it with the Social Democrats and "probably thought of himself as the future holder of the office". Under the political slogan of "true democracy", he proposed a cleansing of the system from the "evil of party rule":

In 1930 Seipel was briefly Austrian foreign minister in the cabinet of Carl Vaugoin. After the bankruptcy of the Creditanstalt Bank in 1931, he was to take over the reins of government again but was unsuccessful in forming a coalition.

Decades later, Bruno Kreisky, Social Democratic Federal Chancellor from 1970 to 1983, criticized his own party for the 1931 events. Seipel had offered Otto Bauer, the head of the Social Democrats, a coalition at the height of the world economic crisis. The party executive, however, had not taken him up on it. "In retrospect, it seems to me clearly wrong not to have pushed harder for a compromise in order to be in government at such a critical moment. ... In my opinion, this was the last chance to save Austrian democracy," Kreisky wrote in 1986.

Seipel had seen in the Jews a class that represented mobile large capital and a "certain kind of merchant mentality" by which the people felt threatened in their economic existence. Austria, Seipel said, was "in danger of being dominated economically, culturally, and politically by the Jews." As a solution to the so-called Jewish question, he proposed recognizing the Jews as a national minority.

While Seipel's politics were initially characterized by a belief in Austria's self-reliance, he later took the view that without the German Reich Austrian politics were not meaningful.

Seipel suffered from tuberculosis and also from diabetes as a consequences of the assassination attempt against him. In December 1930 he went to Merano for a cure, where he received a telegram from Pope Pius XI wishing him a speedy recovery so that he could "return to his so meritorious activity". He died in 1932 in the Lower Austrian sanatorium Wienerwald. Otto Bauer dedicated an obituary to him in the Arbeiter-Zeitung (Workers' Newspaper), in which he attested to Seipel's "honest inner conviction":

Since Seipel was regarded by the Social Democrats as the epitome of reaction and of the alliance between clericalism and capitalism, the article was received with incomprehension by the party base. Bauer felt compelled to point out in another article the difference between "emotional socialists and trained Marxists". While the sentimental socialist hates the capitalist and the spokesmen of the capitalist world, the Marxist understands his opponents as creatures of a hostile social order. Seipel "is to us, precisely because we are Marxists, because he fought us and we fought him, not a villain, but the 'creature of conditions of which he remains socially, however much he may subjectively rise above them'."

Commemorations 
The corporatist, Austro-fascist Federal State of Austria (1934–1938) considered Seipel to be the founding father of the regime. As Seipel's final resting place, the Christ the King Church was built in Vienna's working-class district of Rudolfsheim-Fünfhaus, six blocks from Seipel's birthplace, on the initiative of the women's and workers' rights activist Hildegard Burjan and supported by Chancellor Engelbert Dollfuß. Seipel's coffin was interred in the crypt of the church in the fall of 1934. Dollfuß had been assassinated by a Nazi two months earlier. His successor Kurt Schuschnigg had Dollfuß buried there; the regime named the church the "Seipel-Dollfuß Memorial Church".

After the 1938 annexation of Austria by Nazi Germany, it had both coffins reburied in 1939: Seipel's coffin was moved to a grave of honor at the Vienna Central Cemetery. The grave is located directly next to the presidential crypt in front of the St. Charles Borromeo Cemetery Church, then called the "Dr. Karl Lueger Memorial Church" after the founder of the Christian Social Party. Dollfuß was buried in the Hietzing cemetery in Vienna.

On 27 April 1934 the dictatorial city administration renamed the Ring of November 12, a part of Vienna's Ringstrasse commemorating the founding of the Republic, to the Dr.-Ignaz-Seipel-Ring in the section in front of the Parliament building. In 1940 it was renamed after the Nazi Gauleiter Josef Bürckel; on 27 April 1945 it became Seipel-Ring again and on 8 July 1956 it was given its present name, Dr.-Karl-Renner-Ring.

In the arts 
In Hugo Bettauer's 1922 novel Die Stadt ohne Juden (The City Without Jews), the character of the Christian Socialist Chancellor Dr. Karl Schwertfeger, who has all Jews expelled from the country, is based on Seipel. Hans Karl Breslauer's 1924 film of the same name was based on Bettauer's book.

English language bibliography 
 Seipel, Ignaz: Christian statesman in a time of crisis by Klemens Von Klemperer (Princeton University Press, 1972)
 Fascist Movements in Austria: from Schönerer to Hitler by F. L. (Francis Ludwig) Carsten (London, 1977)
 Jamie Andrew McGregor Bulloch, The Promotion of an Austrian Identity 1918-1938, PhD dissertation (Ch. 1 is about Seipel's political theory)

References

External links 

 
 

|-

|-

|-

1876 births
1932 murders in Austria
People from Meidling
Politicians from Vienna
Clergy from Vienna
20th-century Austrian Roman Catholic priests
Christian Social Party (Austria) politicians
Chancellors of Austria
Foreign ministers of Austria
Members of the Constituent National Assembly (Austria)
Members of the National Council (Austria)
20th-century Chancellors of Austria
Austrian anti-communists
Academic staff of the University of Salzburg
People murdered in Austria
Deaths by firearm in Austria
Assassinated Austrian politicians